Laryngitis is inflammation of the larynx (voice box). Symptoms often include a hoarse voice and may include fever, cough, pain in the front of the neck, and trouble swallowing. Typically, these last under two weeks.

Laryngitis is categorised as acute if it lasts less than three weeks and chronic if symptoms last more than three weeks. Acute cases usually occur as part of a viral upper respiratory tract infection, other infections and trauma such as from coughing are other causes. Chronic cases may occur due to smoking, tuberculosis, allergies, acid reflux, rheumatoid arthritis, or sarcoidosis. The underlying mechanism involves irritation of the vocal cords.

Concerning signs that may require further investigation include stridor, history of radiation therapy to the neck, trouble swallowing, duration of more than three weeks, and a history of smoking. If concerning signs are present the vocal cords should be examined via laryngoscopy. Other conditions that can produce similar symptoms include epiglottitis, croup, inhaling a foreign body, and laryngeal cancer.

The acute form generally resolves without specific treatment. Resting the voice and sufficient fluids may help. Antibiotics generally do not appear to be useful in the acute form. The acute form is common while the chronic form is not. The chronic form occurs most often in middle age and is more common in men than women.

Signs and symptoms 
The primary symptom of laryngitis is a hoarse voice. Because laryngitis can have various causes, other signs and symptoms may vary. They can include
 Dry or sore throat
 Coughing (both a causal factor and a symptom of laryngitis)
 Frequent throat clearing
 Increased saliva production
 Dysphagia (difficulty swallowing)
 Sensation of swelling in the area of the larynx (discomfort in the front of the neck)
 Globus pharyngeus (feeling like there is a lump in the throat)
 Cold or flu-like symptoms (which, like a cough, may also be a causal factor for laryngitis)
 Swollen lymph nodes in the throat, chest, or face
 Fever
 General muscle pain (myalgia)
 Shortness of breath, predominantly in children

Voice quality 
Aside from a hoarse-sounding voice, changes to pitch and volume may occur with laryngitis. Speakers may experience a lower or higher pitch than normal, depending on whether their vocal folds are swollen or stiff. They may also have breathier voices, as more air flows through the space between the vocal folds (the glottis), quieter volume and a reduced range.

Causes

Laryngitis can be infectious as well as noninfectious in origin. The resulting inflammation of the vocal folds results in a distortion of the sound produced there. It normally develops in response to either an infection, trauma to the vocal folds, or allergies. Chronic laryngitis may also be caused by more severe problems, such as nerve damage, sores, polyps, or hard and thick lumps (nodules) on the vocal cords.[4]

Acute

Viral 
 Most acute cases of laryngitis are caused by viral infections, the most common of which tend to be rhinovirus, influenza virus, parainfluenza virus, adenovirus, coronavirus, and RSV. In patients who have a compromised immune system, other viruses such as herpes and HIV may also be potential causes.

Bacterial 
 This is another major cause of acute laryngitis, and may develop in conjunction with or due to a viral infection. Common bacterial strains are group A streptococcus, Streptococcus pneumoniae, C. diphtheriae, M. catarrhalis, Haemophilus influenzae, Bordetella pertussis, Bacillus anthracis, and M. tuberculosis. In developing countries, more unusual bacterial causes may occur, such as mycobacterial and syphilitic, though these may occur in developed nations as well.

Fungal 
 Laryngitis caused by fungal infection is common but not frequently diagnosed according to a review by BMJ and can account for up to 10% of acute laryngitis cases. Patients with both functioning and impaired immune systems can develop fungal laryngitis, which may develop as a result of recent antibiotic or inhaled corticosteroids use. Certain strains of fungi that may cause laryngitis include; Histoplasma, Blastomyces, Candida (especially in immunocompromised persons), and Cryptococcus and Coccidioides.

Trauma 
 Often due to excessive use of the vocal folds such as excessive yelling, screaming, or singing. Though this often results in damage to the outer layers of the vocal folds, the subsequent healing may lead to changes in the physiology of the folds. Another potential cause of inflammation may be overuse of the vocal cords.[5] [6] [7] [8] [9] Laryngeal trauma, including iatrogenic (caused by endotracheal intubation), can also result in inflammation of the vocal cords.

Chronic

Allergies 
 Findings are unclear as to whether asthma may cause symptoms commonly associated with laryngitis. Some researchers have posited that allergic causes of laryngitis are often misdiagnosed as being the result of acid reflux.

Reflux 
 One possible explanation of chronic laryngitis is that inflammation is caused by gastro-oesophageal reflux, which causes subsequent irritation of the vocal folds.

Autoimmune disorders 
 Approximately between 30 and 75% of persons with rheumatoid arthritis report symptoms of laryngitis.
 Symptoms of laryngitis are present in only 0.5–5% of people that have sarcoidosis. According to a meta-analysis by Silva et al. (2007), this disease is often an uncommon cause of laryngeal symptoms and is frequently misdiagnosed as another voice disorder.

Diagnosis
Diagnosis of different forms of acute laryngitis
 Laryngitis following trauma: This form of laryngitis is usually identified by obtaining a case history providing information on previous phono traumatic experiences, internal trauma caused by recent procedures as well as any previous neck injuries.
 Acute viral laryngitis: This form of laryngitis is characterized by lower vocal pitch as well as hoarseness. The symptoms in this form of laryngitis are usually present for less than one week, however they can persist for 3–4 weeks. This form of laryngitis might also be accompanied by upper respiratory tract symptoms such as: sore throat, odynophagia, rhinorrhea, dyspnea, postnasal discharge, and congestion.
 Fungal laryngitis: A biopsy and culture of abnormal lesion may help confirm fungal laryngitis.

Visual diagnosis 
The larynx itself will often show erythema (reddening) and edema (swelling). This can be seen with laryngoscopy or stroboscopy (method depends on the type of laryngitis). Stroboscopy may be relatively normal or may reveal asymmetry, aperiodicity, and reduced mucosal wave patterns.

Other features of the laryngeal tissues may include
 Redness of the laryngeal tissues (acute)
 Dilated blood vessels (acute)
 Thick, yet dry laryngal tissue (chronic)
 Stiff vocal folds
 Sticky secretions between the vocal folds and nearby structures (the interarytenoid region)

Referral 
Some signs and symptoms indicate the need for early referral. These include
 Difficulty swallowing
 Vocal stridor
 Ear pain
 Recent weight loss
 History of smoking
 Current or recent radiotherapy treatment (in the neck region)
 Recent neck surgery or surgery involving endotracheal tubing
 Person is a professional voice user (teacher, singer, actor, call center worker, and so on)

Differential diagnosis
 Acute epiglottitis: This is more likely in those with stridor, drooling, and painful or trouble swallowing.
 Spasmodic dysphonia
 Reflux laryngitis
 Chronic allergic laryngitis
 Neoplasm
 Croup: This presents with a barking cough, hoarseness of voice, and inspiratory stridor.

Treatment
Treatment is often supportive in nature, and depends on the severity and type of laryngitis (acute or chronic). General measures to relieve symptoms of laryngitis include behaviour modification, hydration and humidification.

Vocal hygiene (care of the voice) is very important to relieve symptoms of laryngitis. Vocal hygiene involves measures such as: resting the voice, drinking sufficient water, reducing caffeine and alcohol intake, stopping smoking and limiting throat clearing.

Acute laryngitis 
In general, acute laryngitis treatment involves vocal hygiene, painkillers (analgesics), humidification, and antibiotics.

Viral 
The suggested treatment for viral laryngitis involves vocal rest, pain medication, and mucolytics for frequent coughing. Home remedies such as tea and honey may also be helpful. Antibiotics are not used for treatment of viral laryngitis.

Bacterial 
Antibiotics may be prescribed for bacterial laryngitis, especially when symptoms of upper respiratory infection are present. However, the use of antibiotics is highly debated for acute laryngitis.  This relates to issues of effectiveness, side effects, cost, and possibility of antibiotic resistance patterns. Overall, antibiotics do not appear to be very effective in the treatment of acute laryngitis.

In severe cases of bacterial laryngitis, such as supraglottitis or epiglottitis, there is a higher risk of the airway becoming blocked. An urgent referral should be made to manage the airway. Treatment may involve humidification, corticosteroids, intravenous antibiotics, and nebulised adrenaline.

Fungal 
Fungal laryngitis can be treated with oral antifungal tablets and antifungal solutions. These are typically used for up to three weeks and treatment may need to be repeated if the fungal infection returns.

Trauma
Laryngitis caused by excessive use or misuse of the voice can be managed through vocal hygiene measures.

Chronic laryngitis

Reflux 
Laryngopharyngeal reflux treatment primarily involves behavioural management and medication. Behavioural management involves aspects such as
 Wearing loose clothing
 Eating smaller, more frequent meals
 Avoiding certain foods (e.g. caffeine, alcohol, spicy foods)
Anti-reflux medications may be prescribed for patients with signs of chronic laryngitis and hoarse voice. If anti-reflux treatment does not result in a decrease of symptoms, other possible causes should be examined. Over-the-counter medications for neutralizing acids (antacids) and acid suppressants (H-2 blockers) may be used. Antacids are often short-acting and may not be sufficient for treatment. Proton pump inhibitors are an effective type of medication. These should only be prescribed for a set period of time, after which the symptoms should be reviewed. Proton pump inhibitors do not work for everyone. A physical reflux barrier (e.g. Gaviscon Liquid) may be more appropriate for some. Antisecretory medications can have several side-effects.

When appropriate, anti-reflux surgery may benefit some individuals.

Inflammatory 
When treating allergic laryngitis, topical nasal steroids and immunotherapy have been found to be effective for allergic rhinitis. Antihistamines may also be helpful, but can create a dryness in the larynx. Inhaled steroids that are used for a long period can lead to problems with the larynx and voice.

Autoimmune 
Mucous membrane pemphigoid may be managed with medication (cyclophosphamide and prednisolone).

Granulomatous 
Sarcoidosis is typically treated with systemic corticosteroids. Less frequently used treatments include intralesional injections or laser resection.

Prognosis

Acute 
Acute laryngitis may persist, but will typically resolve on its own within two weeks. Recovery is likely to be quick if the patient follows the treatment plan. In viral laryngitis, symptoms can persist for an extended period, even when upper respiratory tract inflammation has been resolved.

Chronic 
Laryngitis that continues for more than three weeks is considered chronic. If laryngeal symptoms last for more than three weeks, a referral should be made for further examination, including direct laryngoscopy. The prognosis for chronic laryngitis varies depending on the cause of the laryngitis.

References

External links

 
 Mayo Clinic

Acute upper respiratory infections
Human throat
Human voice
Inflammations
Laryngology
Voice disorders
Wikipedia emergency medicine articles ready to translate
Wikipedia medicine articles ready to translate

it:Laringite